Bystrc is a municipal district of the city of Brno in the Czech Republic. It was formerly a village on the banks of the Svratka river, but was incorporated into the city in 1960. The Brno Zoo, Brno Reservoir, Deer Glen Nature Reserve, Krnovec Nature Reserve, Veveří Castle, Monk's Hill and Kopeček Hill (The highest peak in Brno) are located there.

Called also Bástr in local slang dialect Hantec.

References

External links 
 District guide: Bystrc | Brno Now

Brno